In Mandaeism, Libat is the Mandaic name for the planet Venus. Libat is one of the seven planets, who are part of the entourage of Ruha in the World of Darkness.

In Mandaean astrology, Libat is associated with success in love and reproduction. Libat's name is derived from the Akkadian Delebat. Other Mandaean names for Libat include Argiuat, Daitia, Kukbat (the diminutive of 'star'), Spindar, as well as Ruha or Ruha ḏ-qudša (Holy Spirit) and her epithets – Amamit (as an inhabitant of the underworld), and ʿstira (i.e., Ishtar or Astarte).

References

Planets in Mandaeism
Venus in culture